Crithe nanaoensis is a species of very small sea snail, a marine gastropod mollusk or micromollusk in the family Cystiscidae.

References

 oyer F., 2003. The Cystiscidae (Caenogastropoda) from upper reef formations of New Caledonia. Iberus 21(1): 241-272.

Cystiscidae
Gastropods described in 1951
Nanaoensis